The Armed Forces Intelligence Center (CIFAS) is a Spanish intelligence agency dependent of the Defense Staff (EMAD).  It has the function of providing JEMAD, the Ministry of Defense and the Prime Minister with information on risk situations and crises from abroad. In his charge is a Director with rank of General.

It is a unique and joint body of the Spanish Armed Forces in matters of military intelligence, it controls the systems of intelligence and electronic warfare, maintaining the intelligence centers of the Army, Navy and Air Force, functional dependence on the CIFAS. Founded in 2004, it replaces the former Intelligence Division of the Defense Staff.

Functions
 Provide the Chiefs of Staff of the Armies with information for the development of their functions in peacetime missions.
 Provide the Chief of Defense Staff (JEMAD) with the necessary military intelligence for the direction of operations and the design of the strategy.
 Coordinate his task with the General Staff of Defense and its Headquarters.
 To be a complementary military intelligence body of the National Intelligence Center, with whom it is coordinated through the Joint Military Intelligence Plan.
 Collaborate with the intelligence structures of the international organizations of which Spain is a part and with those of the Allied countries.

Directors
 Brigadier General Valentín Martínez Valero (2004-2008) (Army)
 Lieutenant General Miguel Romero López (2008-2011) (Air Force)
 Vice Admiral Juan Antonio Cuadrillero Pinilla (2011-2013) (Navy)
 General of division Francisco José Gan Pampols (2013-2017) (Army)
 General of division Francisco Rosaleny Pardo de Santayana (2017-2019) (Army)
 General of division Antonio Romero Losada (2019-) (Army)

References

2004 establishments in Spain
Government agencies established in 2004
Government of Spain
National law enforcement agencies of Spain
Spanish intelligence agencies
Military intelligence agencies